Some Dreams is the second studio album by the Japanese voice actress idol unit Earphones. It was released on 14 March 2018 through Evil Line Records.  Some Dreams is a concept album with 12 songs that represent different dreams.

Release and promotion 
The album was released on 14 March 2018 in Japan. A limited edition and live edition of the albums were also released. The limited edition featured a bonus CD titled Earphones Music Trip which contained covers of the Neon Genesis Evangelion and Sailor Moon theme songs as well as solo songs sung by each members. The live edition featured live concert footage from Earphones 2nd Anniversary performance "Tsuki Sekai Ryokō Gakudan" (A Trip to the Moon) on Blu-ray.

Prior to the album's release, Earphones released a trailer for the album as well as a music video for "Shinjigen Kouro" and a lyric video for "Atashi no Naka no Monogatari". They also announced the "Some Dreams Tour 2018" for June/July 2018.

Track listing

Personnel
Adapted from the album liner notes.

Earphones
 Marika Kouno
 Rie Takahashi
 Yuki Nagaku

Additional musicians
 a_kira – guitar & programming (Disc1-8)
 Endo – programming (Disc1-7, 10, 11)
 Nozomi Furukawa – guitar (Disc1-6)
 Takuma Hongo – bass (Disc1-8)
 Masaomi Joishi – guitar (Disc1-2)
 Gesshoku Kaigi – band arranged (Disc1-1, Disc 2-7)
 Tomoya Kashimura – bass (Disc1-11)
 Yuriko Koyama – chorus (Disc1-8)
 Akira Kushida – vocal (Disc1-3)
 Koshi Miura – sample & programming (Disc1-5)
 Shige Murata – bass (Disc1-5)
 Rui Nagai – programming, keyboards, guitar & bass (Disc1-12, Disc 2-3) chorus (Disc1-12) 
 NARASAKI – programming (Disc2-2)
 Hitomi Niida – flugelhorn (Disc1-6)
 Takahito Obata – drum (Disc1-12)
 Tomohiro Ohkubo – programming (Disc1-9)
 ROLLY – guitar (Disc1-9, 12) chorus(Disc1-12)
 Shinya Saito – keyboards & programming (Disc1-4)
 Seazer to Akuma no Ie – performance (Disc1-8)
 Yoshinari Takeami – alto & tenor sax (Disc1-4)
 Kazuko Takebayashi – chorus (Disc1-8)
 Masayoshi Tanaka – drum (Disc1-8)
 Kohdai Tominaga – programming (Disc1-6)
 Tsuki Sekai Ryokō Gakudan - band arranged (Disc2-4, 5, 6)
 Hiroaki Tsutsumi – acoustic & electric guitar (Disc1-3)
 Takahiro Yamada – programming (Disc1-2)
 Masaru Yokoyama – programming (Disc1-3, Disc2-1)

Production
 Satoshi Akai – recording (Disc1-5, 6) mixing (Disc1-4, 5, 6)
 Yoshitaka Ishigaki – mixing (Disc1-9)
 Mitsuru Ishii – recording (Disc1-2, 3, 9, 11, Disc2-1, 3) mixing (Disc1-2, Disc2-3)
 Tarou Kimura – recording (Disc1-4, 8)
 Hiroyuki Kishimoto – recording (Disc1-1, 7, 10) mixing (Disc1-1, 7, 10, 11)
 KIMKEN - mastering
 Hideto Matsumoto – recording (Disc1-12)
 Jun Shouji – recording (Disc1-1, 2, 3, 4, 6, 8, 11, 12, Disc2-4, 5, 6, 7) mixing (Disc1-8, 12)
 Seiji Toda – recording (Disc2-2) mixing (Disc2-2)

Artwork and design
 BALCOLONY – art direction, design

Charts

Release history

References

External links
Discography on Earphones official site

Earphones (band) albums
2018 albums
Japanese-language albums